Indiscretion is a 1917 American silent drama film directed by Wilfrid North and starring Lillian Walker, Walter McGrail and Richard Wangermann.

Cast
 Lillian Walker as Penelope Holloway
 Walter McGrail as Jimmy Travers
 Richard Wangermann as Marcellus Holloway 
 Mrs. West as Mrs. Travers
 Katharine Lewis as Margery Travers
 Thomas R. Mills as Reginald Rivers
 Josephine Earle as Mrs. Rivers
 Tom Brooke as Doctor McIntosh
 Robert Gaillard as Harrigan

References

Bibliography
 Robert B. Connelly. The Silents: Silent Feature Films, 1910-36, Volume 40, Issue 2. December Press, 1998.

External links
 

1917 films
1917 drama films
1910s English-language films
American silent feature films
Silent American drama films
American black-and-white films
Vitagraph Studios films
Films directed by Wilfrid North
1910s American films